The 1987 ABN World Tennis Tournament was a men's tennis tournament played on indoor carpet courts at Rotterdam Ahoy in the Netherlands. It was part of the 1987 Nabisco Grand Prix. It was the 15th edition of the tournament and was held from 16 March through 22 March 1987. First-seeded Stefan Edberg won the singles title.

Finals

Singles

 Stefan Edberg defeated  John McEnroe 3–6, 6–3, 6–1
 It was Edberg's 4th singles title of the year and the 11th of his career.

Doubles

 Stefan Edberg /  Anders Järryd defeated  Chip Hooper /  Mike Leach 3–6, 6–3, 6–4

References

External links
 Official website 
 ATP tournament profile
 ITF tournament edition details

 
ABN World Tennis Tournament
ABN World Tennis Tournament
ABN World Tennis Tournament